Donald Maurice Metz (January 10, 1916 – November 16, 2007) was a Canadian professional ice hockey right winger who played parts of nine seasons with the Toronto Maple Leafs of the National Hockey League from 1939 to 1949. While with the Maple Leafs he won the Stanley Cup five times. Born in Wilcox, Saskatchewan, he was the brother of Leafs teammate Nick Metz.

Playing career
Metz was an integral part of the Leafs' come from behind victory in the 1942 Stanley Cup Finals against the Detroit Red Wings. In game five, he scored three goals and two assists to lead the Leafs to a 9–3 victory. He also scored the game-winning goal in game six. What made Metz' accomplishment more successful is that he was not put in the lineup until the Leafs were down 3–0; the Leafs won all four games in which he was dressed. Metz finished the series with four goals and three assists.

The rest of his years were split between the Leafs and the AHL's Pittsburgh Hornets. He ended up playing 172 NHL games, scoring 20 goals and 35 assists for 55 points during the regular season.

Career statistics

Regular season and playoffs

Awards
 Won the Stanley Cup in 1942, 1945, 1947, 1948, 1949

See also
Notable families in the NHL

External links

1916 births
2007 deaths
Athol Murray College of Notre Dame alumni
Canadian expatriate ice hockey players in the United States
Canadian ice hockey forwards
Ice hockey people from Saskatchewan
Ontario Hockey Association Senior A League (1890–1979) players
Pittsburgh Hornets players
Stanley Cup champions
Toronto Maple Leafs players
Toronto St. Michael's Majors players